McNeil v. Wisconsin, 501 U.S. 171 (1991), held that the right to counsel secured by the Sixth Amendment and the right to counsel protected by Miranda v. Arizona are separate and distinct, such that invoking one does not implicitly invoke the other.

Facts 
Paul McNeil was arrested in May, 1987, on suspicion that he had committed armed robbery in West Allis, Wisconsin, near Milwaukee. He invoked his Miranda rights and the police ceased questioning him. He was arraigned, and a bail hearing was held. He was represented by a public defender at this hearing. After the bail hearing, McNeil was approached by other detectives investigating a murder in Caledonia, Wisconsin, near Racine.

McNeil waived his Miranda rights when talking to the detective about the Caledonia murder. McNeil denied being there, however. Two days later the detective returned; this time McNeil again waived his Miranda rights but admitted being involved in the Caledonia murder along with two other men. Two days after that the detectives interviewed McNeil for a third time. This time, McNeil waived his Miranda rights and then admitted he had lied to the police in the previous interview regarding the involvement of one of the other men.

Eventually, McNeil was tried for the Caledonia murder. He moved to suppress the three statements about that incident he had given to the police on the grounds that they had violated his right to counsel because he had been represented by a lawyer at the bail hearing on the West Allis robbery. The trial court denied the motion, and McNeil was convicted and sentenced to 60 years in prison.

McNeil appealed, arguing that the trial court should have suppressed his three statements to the police regarding the Caledonia murder. The Wisconsin Supreme Court affirmed the conviction, and the U.S. Supreme Court agreed to hear the case.

Opinion of the Court 
In an opinion for the Court, Justice Scalia agreed with the lower courts that the fact that McNeil had been represented by a lawyer at the bail hearing on the West Allis robbery charge did not give McNeil a right to counsel with respect to the Caledonia murders. The Sixth Amendment right to counsel is offense-specific, and cannot be invoked once for all future prosecutions. In Michigan v. Jackson, the Court had held that once the Sixth Amendment right to counsel attaches, the police may not question a defendant regarding that crime. But implicit in the Jackson ruling was the fact that the protection against subsequent interrogation related only to the crime with which the defendant had been charged. Because McNeil had not been charged with the Caledonia crimes at the time of the bail hearing on the West Allis hearing, the Sixth Amendment could not have given McNeil a way to avoid police questioning about the Caledonia murder.

Although both the Sixth Amendment and the Fifth Amendment (through Miranda) involve a right to counsel, these right to counsel guard against two different risks. The Sixth Amendment preserves a defendant's right to meet the "expert adversary" of the government with an equally skilled adversary. The Miranda right to counsel, by contrast, guards against the inherently coercive nature of police interrogation and ensures that criminal suspects give statements to the police voluntarily. Thus, the Miranda right to counsel is not offense specific, for once a suspect has invoked the protections of Miranda, the police may not approach him again at all.

A criminal defendant may give up either or both of these rights, of course, but the standards for doing so are quite different. "One might be quite willing to speak to the police without counsel present concerning many matters, but not the matter under prosecution. It can be said, perhaps, that is it likely that one who has asked for counsel's assistance in defending against a prosecution would want counsel present for all custodial interrogation, even interrogation unrelated to the charge." Thus, waivers of Miranda rights are generally situation-specific and easy to accomplish, while waivers of the right to counsel for purposes of trial waive it for not only the trial but ancillary proceedings as well, and is correspondingly more difficult to effectuate.

The Court acknowledged that it might have the power to link the two waivers, but that it would be imprudent to do so. If having a lawyer for one prosecution meant that a criminal defendant could not be questioned regarding any crime at all without the lawyer's presence, "most persons in pretrial custody for serious offenses would be unapproachable by police officers suspecting them of involvement in other crimes, even though they have never expressed any unwillingness to be questioned."

See also
 List of United States Supreme Court cases, volume 501
 List of United States Supreme Court cases
 Lists of United States Supreme Court cases by volume
 List of United States Supreme Court cases by the Rehnquist Court

References

External links
 

United States Supreme Court cases
United States Fifth Amendment self-incrimination case law
United States Sixth Amendment assistance of counsel case law
1991 in United States case law
West Allis, Wisconsin
United States Supreme Court cases of the Rehnquist Court